The Pyongyang Korean School for Foreigners is a primary school in Pyongyang, Democratic People's Republic of Korea (DPRK), a.k.a. North Korea, exclusively for foreign children. It has also a facility for foreign children studying on secondary school level. The school is located at the Munsudong diplomatic compound in Pyongyang, the capital of the DPRK. The children who attend are mainly dependents of the diplomatic community and the United Nations agencies in the country, although also children of foreign businessmen, mainly Chinese, have been joining the school. All teachers are Korean. The language of instruction is English. Local textbooks in English are used. English and mathematics are the two major subjects, with Korean language, music, art and physical education as minor subjects; from class 3 onwards also science is provided as minor subject. In the early 1990s the official name in English of the school was "Pyongyang Foreigners School", which is the straight translation of the name of the school in Korean (평양외국인학교), which did not change.

History

Pre-DPRK history
A school with the same name in Korean, but the English language name "Pyeng Yang Foreign School" operated as an American Presbyterian mission school(founded in 1900), and was closed in 1940 with the greater militarization of Korea and antagonistic attitude towards foreigners by the then Japanese government, and the missionary faculties involved continued their legacy from 1958 in another missionary school called Taejon Christian International School. Mrs. Ruth Bell Graham, wife of evangelist Billy Graham, attended this school in the 1930s. The buildings of the Pyeng Yang Foreign School were destroyed during the Korean War, and the site was used to build the Embassy of the Soviet Union, the present Russian Embassy complex. The Russian Embassy also includes a Russian school open for all foreign children of the diplomatic community, with Russian as the language of instruction.

References

 site that references the Pyeng Yang Foreign School

External links     
 Video of the school 2015
 Video of the school 2015
  Video of the school 2015
  Video of the school 2017 -- starts at 40 seconds and at 9:40
 Video of the school
 Wikimapia location of the school
 External Photo
 Social Media site for students of the school
 Media story regarding a meeting with female teachers of the school
  Instagram photo collection
 Media story about the life of foreigners who reside in Pyongyang, including attendance at the school.

International schools in North Korea
Education in Pyongyang